Baniachong is an upazila of Habiganj District in the Division of Sylhet, Bangladesh. Village Baniyachong is the biggest and the most populous village in Asia.

History
Baniachong constituted the grand estate (zamindari) of Anwar Khan, who was looked upon as a raja by the local people. Estate of Baniachong was so vast it crisscrossed all districts of Sylhet region as well as the greater Mymensingh, Dhaka and Comilla.

In accordance with the Pargana system introduced by Murshid Quli Khan in 1722, Anwar Khan claimed tenure of 28 Parganas of Muazzamabad, but his claim was rejected after an investigation by the revenue office, as these Parganas belong to the posterity of Shah Muazzam Uddin Qureshi, who assumed the name of Muazzam Khan when he ascended the throne of Muazzamabad.

Hence, these 28 Parganas: Banshikunda (Vamshikunda), Ranadigha, Shelvarsh, Sukhaid, Bétaal, Palash, Laxmanshree, Chamtala, Pagla (Paragala), Dohaliya, Bazu Jatua, Sinchapaid, Shafahar (Shaharpara), Sik Sonaita (Sonauta), Atuajan (Atuajahan), Aatgaon, Kuwazpur, Joar Baniyachung,  Kasba Baniyachung, Jalsuka, Bithangal, Joanshahi, Mudaikaid (Mudakadi), Kuresha, Jantari (Yantri), Haveli Sonaita, Satar Sati and Paikuda, were allotted to new landholders that created numerous zamindars and taluquedars in former Muazzamabad (districts of Sunamganj and Habiganj).

The history of the battle between Anwar Khan and his brother Hussain Khan (Bara Bhuiyans of Baniachang) with the Mughal army in the first decade of the seventeenth century is found in the Baharistan-i-Gayebi. Zamindars of Banyachung was renowned for their generosity, but the last zamindar was more than generous; he was well known for his  gullibility and his aged but adept and calculating servants such as dewans and chaudharies swindled him left, right and centre.  By the time of the retirement, dewans and chauddharies working for Banyachung zamindar ended up holding more lands than the zamindar himself. This was achieved through a severance scheme conjured up by a shrewd dewan; this scheme made the zamindar honour-bound to grant land (taluque) to his servants on retirement and there were two categories of taluque: (i) Khalisa and (ii) Mujrahi, aka Mujrai. The first category of taluque, i.e. Khalisa, was reserved for the male servants and the second category of taluque, i.e. Mujrai, was reserved for zamindar's courtesans.  This scheme ruined the zamindary of Baniyachung within a very short span of time and created numerous Khalisadar and Mujraidar in the region, who nowadays style themselves as chowdhury in Sylhet region.

Geography
It has 59,433 households and total area 482.46 km2.

Demographics
As of the 2022 Bangladesh census, Baniachong has a population of 3,34,605. Males constitute 50.84% of the population, and females 49.16%. This Upazila's eighteen up population is 115151. Baniachong has an average literacy rate of 20.8% (7+ years), and the national average of 32.4% literate.

Baniachang Upazila with an area of 482.46 km2, is bounded by sullah and derai upazilas on the north, habiganj sadar and lakhai upazilas on the south, Habiganj sadar and nabiganj upazilas on the east, ajmiriganj, mithamain and austagram upazilas on the west. Main rivers are Kushiyara, Kalai and Barak. Notable Beels: Charagaon, Bata, Sonamua, Dhala, Chatal and Chandra Beel.

Baniachang (Town) consists of 7 mouzas. The area of the town is 3.06 km2. It has a population of 21111; male 50.75%, female 49.25%. Literacy rate among the town people is 25.3%. Once the town was the capital of the ancient Loud Kingdom of Sylhet. It has one post house ("dak bungalow").

Administration
Baniachang thana, now an upazila, was established in 1790 and was turned into a sub-division of a district in 1934.

Baniachang Upazila is divided into 15 union parishads: Baraiuri, Dakshin Paschim Baniachong, Dakshin Purba Baniachong, Daulatpur, Kagapasha, Khagaura, Makrampur, Mandari, Muradpur, Pailar Kandi, Pukhra, Sujatpur, Subidpur, Uttar Paschim Baniachong, and Uttar Purba Baniachong. The union parishads are subdivided into 237 mauzas and 359 villages.

Archaeological heritage and relics Remnants of ancient Rajbari (1737–38) at Puranbagh, Bibir Dargah Mosque, Bithangal Akhra.
 Chairman: Md. Abul Kashem Chowdhury
 Vice Chairman: Faruk Amin Talukder
 Woman Vice Chairman: Hasina Akther
 Upazila Nirbahi Officer (UNO): Padmasan Singha

Notable people
Fazle Hasan Abed KCMG, founder of the world's largest non-governmental organisation, BRAC
Mawlana Muhammad Arshad, 16th-century author
Ramnath Biswas, soldier and writer best known for circumnavigating the globe by bicycle
Sirajul Hossain Khan, former editor of Pakistan Times and the Eastern News Agency
Mohammad Abdur Rab (Bir Uttam), 1st Chief of Staff of the Bangladesh Army, Major general during the Bangladesh Liberation War
Najmul Hasan Zahed, Awami League politician

See also
 Upazilas of Bangladesh
 Districts of Bangladesh
 Divisions of Bangladesh

References

Upazilas of Habiganj District